The Fantasia 37 is a French sailboat that was designed by Philippe Harlé as a cruiser and first built in 1984.

Production
The design was built by Jeanneau in France, starting in 1984, but it is now out of production.

Design
The Fantasia 37 is a recreational keelboat, built predominantly of fiberglass, with wood trim. It has a masthead sloop rig, displaces  and carries  of ballast.

The design has a hull speed of

See also
List of sailing boat types

References

Keelboats
1980s sailboat type designs
Sailing yachts
Sailboat type designs by Philippe Harlé
Sailboat types built by Jeanneau